L.A. Louver is an art gallery focusing on American and European contemporary art.  The gallery is located in Venice, Los Angeles, California, United States.

Directors
The gallery directors are Peter Goulds, Kimberly Davis, and Elizabeth East.  Lisa Jann is the Managing Director. The gallery is a member of the Art Dealers Association of America.

Artists
Established in 1976, the gallery represents the following notable artists:

 Terry Allen
 Tony Berlant
 Tony Bevan
 William Brice
 Deborah Butterfield
 Rebecca Campbell
 Dale Chihuly
 Richard Deacon
 Mark di Suvero

 Gajin Fujita
 Charles Garabedian
 David Hockney
 Frederick Hammersley
 Ben Jackel
 Edward & Nancy Reddin Kienholz
 Per Kirkeby
 Leon Kossoff
 Guillermo Kuitca

 R.B. Kitaj
 Jonathan Lasker
 Jason Martin
 Enrique Martínez Celaya
 Michael C. McMillen
 Ed Moses
 Gwynn Murrill
 Ken Price
 Sandra Mendelsohn Rubin

 Alison Saar
 Sean Scully
 Joel Shapiro
 Peter Shelton
 Don Suggs
 Juan Uslé
 Fred Williams
 Tom Wudl

Design
The  building that houses the gallery was designed by architect Frederick Fisher.

References

External links
L.A. Louver Website
Ed Kienholz at L.A. Louver in The Los Angeles Times
Gaijin Fujita at L.A. Louver

Art museums and galleries in Los Angeles
Contemporary art galleries in the United States
Venice, Los Angeles
Art galleries established in 1976
1976 establishments in California